Tamoya gargantua, commonly known as the warty sea wasp, is a venomous jellyfish in the genus Tamoya. Its tentacle height is 22 cm, and the width of the bell is 13 cm. It is found on the shores of Eastern Africa, Samoa, and some of the islands in the Indian Ocean. They can be found in bays in those areas.

References

Tamoyidae
Animals described in 1880
Taxa named by Ernst Haeckel